Chet is a masculine given name, often a nickname for Chester, which means fortress or camp. It is an uncommon name of English origin, and originated as a surname to identify people from the city of Chester, England. Chet was ranked 1,027th in popularity for males of all ages in a sample of the 1990 US Census.

People named Chet include:

 Chet (murza) (fl. 14th century), murza of the Golden Horde and legendary progenitor of several Russian families
 Chet Allen (1939–1984), American child opera and choir performer
 Chester Chet Atkins (1924–2001), American country guitarist and record producer
 Chesney Chet Baker (1929–1988), American jazz musician and vocalist
 Chet Bitterman (1952-1981), American linguist and Christian missionary
 Chet Brooks (born 1966), American former National Football League player
 Chester Chet Bulger (1917–2009), American National Football League player
 Chester Chet Culver (born 1966), former Governor of Iowa
 Thomas Chester Chet Edwards (born 1951), American politician
 Fulvio Chester Chet Forte (1935–1996), American sports television director and basketball player
 Chester Chet Gardner (1898–1939), American race car driver
 Chester Chet Gladchuk (1917–1967), National Football League and Canadian Football League player
 Donald Chester Chet Grant (1892–1985), American basketball and football player, football and All-American Girls Professional Baseball League coach and sports editor
 Chester Marlon Chet Hanks (born 1990), American actor and musician, son of Tom Hanks
 Chet Hanulak (born 1933), American former National Football League player
 Chester E. Holifield (1903–1995), American politician
 Chet Holmgren (born 2002), American basketball player
 Chester Chet Huntley (1911–1974), American television newscaster
 Chester Chet Jastremski (1941–2014), American swimmer
 Chester Chet Jaworski (1916–2003), American college basketball player
 Chester Chet Lemon (born 1955), American retired Major League Baseball player
 Chet Miksza (1930–1975), Canadian Football League player
 Chet Moeller (born 1953), American college football player
 Chester Chet Mutryn (1921–1995), All-America Football Conference and the National Football League player
 Chester Chet Nichols Sr. (1897–1982), Major League Baseball pitcher
 Chester Chet Nichols Jr. (1931–1995), Major League Baseball pitcher, son of the above
 Chester Chet Ostrowski (1930–2001), American National Football League player
 Chet Raymo (born 1936), American writer, educator and naturalist
 Chester Chet Walker (born 1940), American National Basketball Association player
 Chester Chet A. Wynne (1898–1967), American football player and college head coach

Fictional characters
 Chet Ubetcha, reporter from "The Fairly OddParents"
 Chet Alexander, from Monsters University
 Chet, from Turbo
 Chet Walters, from Beverly Hills Ninja''''
 Chet, from Fetch! With Ruff Ruffman Chet, from Total Drama Presents: The Ridonculous Race Chet "The Rocket" Steadman, from the film Rookie of the Year Chester "Chet" Desmond, from Fire Walk with Me Chet Kaminski, from Ash vs Evil Dead''

References

English masculine given names
English given names
Lists of people by nickname
Hypocorisms